Fabien Tilliet (born 3 March 1980 in Annecy) is a French rower. He competed for France at the 2008 Summer Olympics and won medals at seven World Rowing Championships from 2004 through 2012.

External links 
 
 
 

1980 births
Living people
French male rowers
Sportspeople from Annecy
Olympic rowers of France
Rowers at the 2008 Summer Olympics
World Rowing Championships medalists for France
21st-century French people